Deborah Armfield "Deb" Butler is an American politician and attorney serving as  a member of the North Carolina House of Representatives, where she has served since 2017. She represents the 18th House District, covering a portion of New Hanover County, as a member of the Democratic Party.

North Carolina General Assembly
In 2012 Butler unsuccessfully challenged Republican Thom Goolsby for a seat in the North Carolina Senate, losing by an 8 point margin. Butler was appointed to the North Carolina House of Representatives in 2017 to succeed Susi Hamilton, after Hamilton was appointed to head the North Carolina Department of Natural and Cultural Resources by Governor Roy Cooper. She has been re-elected to the seat twice, most recently in 2020.

Personal life
Butler identifies as lesbian. She is one of four openly LGBT officeholders currently serving in the North Carolina state legislature, alongside caucus colleagues Marcia Morey, Allison Dahle and Cecil Brockman.

Butler works as a lawyer in Wilmington, North Carolina. She married Anni Parra in 2015.

Electoral history

2020

2018

2012

Committee assignments

2021-2022 Session
Banking 
Commerce 
Finance 
Judiciary III 
Transportation

2019-2020 Session
Banking 
Commerce 
Finance 
Transportation 
Redistricting

2017-2018 Session
Aging
Finance
Judiciary IV
State and Local Government I
State Personnel

References

External links

Living people
Year of birth missing (living people)
People from Wilmington, North Carolina
Politicians from Wilmington, North Carolina
University of Tennessee alumni
Wake Forest University alumni
21st-century American politicians
Democratic Party members of the North Carolina House of Representatives
LGBT state legislators in North Carolina
Women state legislators in North Carolina
Lesbian politicians
21st-century American women politicians
21st-century American LGBT people